This is a list of rail accidents from 1970 to 1979.

1970
 February 1 – Argentina – Benavídez rail disaster: A Tucumán–Buenos Aires express train collides with a standing local train south of Benavídez railroad station 29 km (18 miles) north of Buenos Aires. 142 people are killed, 368 injured (though some sources state 236 killed).
February 16 – Nigeria – A train crowded with Eid al-Kabir pilgrims derails at Langalanga about 27 km southeast of Gusau and several cars fall down an embankment.  About 150 are killed; reportedly, 52 of the injured are killed in a truck crash on the way to hospital.
 March 22 – United States – Branford, Connecticut: A Penn Central freight train derails on the Shore Line Division (now the Northeast Corridor) in Branford center. 25 of the 86 cars on the train derailed, demolishing Branford Station (a passenger shed at the time), and tore up a half mile (800 m) of track. The cause of the accident was the breakage of an overheated axle on a car loaded with 83 tons (75 t) of steel, which the weight of dragged the following 24 cars off with it.
 May 20 – United Kingdom – Audenshaw Junction rail accident: A Class 506 electric multiple unit derails at Audenshaw Junction, Cheshire due to a set of points moving under it. Two people are killed and thirteen are injured. The cause of the accident was irregular practices by a signalman.
The South East Main Line is blocked for three days.
June 21 - United States - A Toledo, Peoria and Western Railway train derails in downtown Crescent City, Illinois. A propane tank car ruptured and explosions caused fires that destroyed the city center, which included numerous houses and businesses. There were no deaths, although over 60 firefighters and civilians were injured.
Two people are killed.
 August 9 – Spain – A train from coastal resorts to Bilbao collides with a freight train at Plentzia; 33 people are killed, about 200 injured, and two stationmasters arrested.
 October 31  – India – A Mangalore Mail crashes into a stationary Cochin Mail at 8:10 p.m. (IST) at the Perambur station, Chennai, killing 16 and injuring 108.
 December 6 – United States – 1970 Lehigh Valley Railroad derailment: Twenty-five cars of a 114-car Lehigh Valley Railroad freight train derail in Le Roy, New York. There are no injuries or fatalities, but a toxic chemical spill results in the scene becoming a United States Environmental Protection Agency Superfund site in 1999. Over 40 years later, this chemical spill was briefly thought to have caused an illness outbreak in the town.
 December 31 – Iran – Two trains collide at Ardakan due to a signalman's error; a government source indicates 15 people killed, but journalists reported at least 70, with 130 injured.

1971

 January 18 – Switzerland – Two commuter trains collide between Feldmeilen and Herrliberg. Six people are killed and seventeen are injured.
 February 9 – West Germany – Aitrang: The TEE 56 Bavaria, a SBB RAm TEE DMU, traveling from Munich to Zürich, derails while passing a curve shortly after Aitrang station. The maximum speed in the curve is 80 km/h, however the train passes the curve at 130 km/h because of frozen water in the air brake. Shortly after the TEE has derailed, a railbus hits the wreckage, coming from the opposite direction. 28 people die, 42 are injured.
 February 14 – Yugoslavia – In a tunnel near Vranduk (now in Bosnia and Herzegovina), the driver stops a passenger train when its diesel-electric locomotive catches fire; but the fire spreads to the passenger cars and many people are unable to escape from the smoke.  At least 34 are killed.
One person is killed and ten are injured.
 March 11 – Chile – Gualliguaica rail accident: A five-car passenger train runs away on a downslope from Vicuña to Cresta de Gualliguaica and derails, plunging into a ravine; 12 killed.
The driver, who was killed, was apparently reading a book.
 May 27 – West Germany – Dahlerau train disaster: At Radevormwald, a railbus and a freight train collide on the Wuppertal–Radevormwald single-track line near Dahlerau station. The railbus was a special service carrying schoolchildren from a Radevormwald school. The local dispatcher claims to have signalled a red light to the freight train, whilst the freight train engineer claims to have seen a green one. Ultimately, the case cannot be resolved as the dispatcher is killed in a car accident before the legal hearings start. 41 people die, 25 are injured. Worst rail accident in West Germany during Deutsche Bundesbahn times. The accident leads to the phasing out of the Nachtbefehlsstab ("Nighttime Command Staff"), and presses the DB to introduce radio communications on branch lines.
 June 10 – United States – 1971 Salem, Illinois, derailment: Amtrak train number 1, the northbound City of New Orleans derails at  due to a false flange on a flat wheel caused by a seized axle bearing. Eleven people die and over 150 injured in Amtrak's first major incident.
 July 2 – United Kingdom – As a 10-car special school excursion train from Rhyl to Smethwick is passing Tattenhall Junction, the track shifts under the train due to thermal stress and the last three cars are derailed, killing two children and injuring 26 people.
A passenger train is in collision with the derailed wagons.
 July 21 – West Germany – Rheinweiler: D 370 from Basel to Copenhagen passes a 75 km/h curve at about 140 km/h and derails, destroying a detached house; 23 people die, 121 are injured. The suspected reason for the accident was a technical failure in the Class 103 engine's automatic cruise control mechanism, leading to the engine gaining too much speed. The cruise control was consequently disabled after the accident and restricted speed zones were equipped with PZB.
 August 4 – Yugoslavia – At Lipe, near Belgrade (now in Serbia), a goods train fails to stop to let a passenger train go by, and collides with it on a single-track section; 35 are killed.
 August 28 – Switzerland – A train derails in the Simplon Tunnel. Five people are killed.
 October 6 – United Kingdom – A 24-car freight train runs away on the downgrade from Beattock Summit toward Carlisle due to stopcocks in the air-brake line being closed. It collides with the train ahead, killing one crew member on that train.
 October 19 – United States – Twenty cars of 82-car Missouri Pacific Railroad train No. 94 derail in Houston, Texas; two tank cars loaded with vinyl chloride monomer are punctured, allowing the gas to escape and ignite; 45 minutes after the derailment a third tank car explodes and a fourth is "rocketed" some 300 feet (91 m) away; a fireman is killed and 50 are injured.
 October 26 – Japan – On the Kinki Nippon Railway, between Osaka and Nagoya, a head-on collision kills 23 people.

1972
Fifteen people are injured.
 January 16 – Greece – Orfana rail disaster At around 16:45, a breakdown in communication between the corresponding stationmasters at Doxaras and Orfana caused an express train and a military relief train to collide in bad weather on the single track line. The southbound diesel hauled Acropolis Express and northbound Number 121 Athens-Thessaloniki, (known as posta) were allowed to proceed without first allowing a passing loop. 21 people died, and more than 40 were injured in one of the deadliest rail accidents in Greece. Nikolaos Gekas The stationmaster at Orfana was later sentenced to 5 years for his part in the disaster.
 March 24 – United States – Gilchrest Road, New York crossing accident: a school bus is struck by a freight train at a level crossing in Rockland County, New York, near the New York City suburbs of Congers and Valley Cottage, killing five students. The bus driver was convicted of negligent homicide and sentenced to probation; the accident also led the U.S. law that requires school buses to stop at all grade crossings they encounter.
 March 31 – South Africa – A derailment on the approach to a bridge at Potgietersrus (now Mokopane), possibly due to sabotage, kills 38 people and injures 174.
 April 26 – India – A derailment north of Bangalore (now Bengaluru) kills 21 and injures 37.
 May 7 – United Kingdom – Two Class 20 diesel locomotives overrun signals and are derailed by trap points at Barnwood Junction, Gloucester.
No injuries are caused, but a fire initiated by the accident causes significant damage to the station.
 June 3 – Poland – Ślesin, (near Bydgoszcz): About 12.20 p.m. a train Kolobrzeg–Warsaw derailed on fatigue rail – 12 people killed, 26 injured
 June 4 – Bangladesh – A crowded passenger train from Khulna crashes into a stationary freight train at Jessore when the stationmaster throws the wrong switch; 76 people are killed and about 500 injured.
 June 11 – United Kingdom – Eltham Well Hall rail crash: An excursion train took a bend at excessive speed and derailed, at Eltham, London. The driver and five passengers were killed, and 126 people injured. The subsequent investigation established that the driver had been drinking.
 June 17 – France – After 110 years in service, the roof of a tunnel at Vierzy collapses without warning. Altogether 108 are killed and 240 injured; survivors are trapped in the tunnel for up to 40 hours.
 July 21 – Spain – A Madrid-to-Cádiz train collides near Jerez with a local train that failed to obey signals; of about 700 on board the two trains, 76 are killed and 103 injured.
 August 8 – Pakistan – At Liaqatpur on the line between Lahore and Karachi, an express is misrouted onto a side track where a freight train is standing; there are 38, or 60, or 65 deaths.
 September 29 – South Africa – All but the first-class cars of a 9-car passenger train from Cape Town to Bitterfontein derail near Malmesbury due to excess speed; 48 or about 100 people are killed.
The engineer is found to have been drinking; he is saved from lynching but is arrested along with five other crew members.
Twelve people are injured.
 October 30 – United States – Chicago commuter rail crash, Two Illinois Central Railroad commuter trains collide, after one train, having overshot a station stop, backs into the station. 45 people are killed and over 300 injured.
 October 30 – East Germany – Schweinsburg-Culten: The driver of Ext 346 (Leipzig–Karlovy Vary) does not notice a stop signal on a single-track stretch of line because of dense fog and collides with D 273 heading toward Berlin. 22 people die, 70 are injured.
 October 31 – Turkey – A passenger train and a train carrying oil collide at Eskişehir, starting a fire and causing several cars to go down a cliff; at least 30 are killed, and about 50 injured.
 November 6 – Japan – When a fire starts in the dining car of the Japanese National Railways' Kitaguni night train from Osaka to Aomori, the crew makes an emergency stop—with the train  into the  Hokoriku Tunnel (between Tsuruga and Imajō on the Hokuriku Main Line).  Crew members attempt to uncouple the dining car at both ends and evacuate the train using the undamaged front part, but the power to that track fails.  Rescue is still possible via the other track but the heavy smoke overcomes people and some are not rescued until almost 13 hours have passed.  One crew member and 29 passengers are killed by carbon monoxide and 714 people are injured—almost everyone else on board.
 November 22 – Netherlands – At the Railway accident near Halfweg (1972), the locomotive of a work train derailed in North Holland and was subsequently wrecked on site.
 December 16 – United Kingdom – two electric multiple unit passenger trains are in collision at Copyhold Junction, West Sussex because the driver of one of them misread signals. Twenty-five people are injured.

1973 
 January 30 – Hungary – Kecskemét level crossing disaster: A regular local bus disregards crossing signals and booms and is crushed by local train. 37 people killed, 18 injured.
 February 1 – Algeria – A derailment kills 35 people and injures 51.
 February 6 – United States –  Littlefield, Texas: A Santa Fe freight train crashes into a schoolbus, killing 7 children and injuring 16. 
 March 9  – United States – White Haven, Pennsylvania: A runaway train crashes into the Lehigh Valley Railroad Engine House, damaging the southeast corner of the building 
 March 13 – United States – Hortense, Georgia: The Southbound auto-train derails after being hit by a truck that failed to stop at a railroad crossing.
 March 18 – United States – East Palestine, Ohio: Amtrak's westbound Broadway Limited derails last five cars in heavy snowstorm, killing one Penn Central employee riding on a pass, and injuring 19 of 167 passengers on board. A spokesman said recent heavy rains may have weakened the roadbed.
 May 2 – United Kingdom – A freight train is derailed inside Disley Tunnel, Cheshire. Six of the sixteen Presflow (bulk cement) wagons that made up the train derailed. The train ran derailed for about  before breaking apart and stopping.
 June – United Kingdom – A freight train runs away and derails at Ashwood Dale, Staffordshire. The line is closed for several months.
 May 10 - Canada - Stettler, Alta. Canadian National Railways 'Dayliner"  was southbound on the regular Edmonton-to-Drumheller line at an uncontrolled crossing, 19 km (12 miles) south and one mile (1600 m) west of Stettler when the collision happened. A 1964 automobile carrying 6 teenagers struck the lefthand side of the unit and pushed it off the track. The article states that the car was dragged about 200 feet (61 metres) after the collision. A police spokesperson said the driver was either blinded by the sun or did not see the train. All six teenagers in the car were killed. source https://www.newspapers.com/clip/34245797/fenn-deaths/ 
 July 10 – East Germany – Leipzig: The driver of a commuter train fails to notice a diversion, causing the train to derail and hit the signal box of Leipzig-Leutzsch railway station. Four people are killed, 25 injured.
 August 27 – Poland – Radkowice, (near Kielce): At 2.42 a.m., a Zakopane–Warsaw passenger train slams into twenty freight cars which break away from a freight train – 16 people killed, 24 injured
 October 10 – United States – Bronx, New York: 6:09 commuter train from Brewster derails on Penn Central's Harlem Division at about 7:30am at 155th Street in the Mott Haven Yard. It crashes into a signal gantry bringing it down on top of the train. There were two minor injuries and 40,000 commuters were delayed for up to four hours.
 December 17 – Brazil – An express passenger train collided head-on with a freight train on the outskirts of Salvador, Bahia, killing 18 people, another 40 are injured.
 December 19 – United Kingdom – Ealing rail crash: An express passenger train derails at Ealing Broadway station because a loose battery-box door on the locomotive hauling it struck point rodding, causing a set of points to move under the locomotive. Ten people are killed and 94 are injured.
 United Kingdom – An electric multiple unit overruns a signal and rear-ends a diesel multiple unit at Shields Junction, Glasgow, Renfrewshire.

1974 
 February 12 – United States – A 122-car Delaware and Hudson freight train derails four miles (6.4 km) north of Oneonta, New York. 54 people (most of them firefighters) were injured when a propane car that had been punctured when the train derailed and two other propane tanker cars exploded. Several nearby homes were also damaged in the blast.
 March 26 – Switzerland – A train derails at Moutier. Three people are killed and thirteen are injured.
 March 27 – Portuguese Mozambique – Magude train disaster: A passenger train collides with a freight train carrying petroleum products. 70 people were killed and 200 injured when the petroleum exploded, melting several passenger coaches.
 July 19 – United States – Decatur, Illinois – A tanker car containing isobutane collides with a Norfolk & Western boxcar causing an explosion killing seven people, injuring 349, and causing $18 million in property damage.
 August 12 – United States – Wake Forest, North Carolina: The Amtrak Silver Star derailed while navigating a curve, injuring 28.
Fifteen people are injured.
 August 30 – Yugoslavia – Zagreb train disaster: An express train from Athens to Dortmund derails at Zagreb railway station due to excessive speed. 152 passengers were killed and 90 injured.
 October 31 – India – On an express train from Delhi to Calcutta (now Kolkata), a fire is started when a passenger's fireworks explode at Mohanganj;  some passengers try to jump from the train before it stops. Altogether 52 are killed or 43 are killed and about 60 injured.
 September 21 – United States – Houston, Texas – At Southern Pacific's Englewood Yard hump, two "jumbo" tank cars, being classified by gravity and with excessive speed collided with an empty tank car which caused it to ride over the coupler of a loaded tank car and puncture the tank head. Butadiene spilled from the car and formed a vapor cloud, which dispersed over the area. After 2 to 3 minutes, the vapor exploded violently; as a result, 1 person died and 235 were injured.
 October 21 – Ireland – Gormanston, County Meath. Two people were killed and 29 were injured.

1975
 February 4 – China – Liaoning, Haicheng: when the 31 through passenger express train from Dalian to Beijing was running in front of tangwangshan of Shenyang Dalian railway, the train driver suddenly found a large area of blue and white flash in front of the train, immediately realized that it was the Earthquake light, judged that the earthquake was coming, and the driver calmly implemented deceleration braking. In the process of deceleration, Haicheng earthquake occurred. Because the speed had been reduced to very low, there was no accident, Finally, the train stopped safely, ensuring the safety of all passengers.
 February 22 – Norway – Tretten train disaster: A passenger train from Oslo collides head-on with an express train from Trondheim. 27 people killed.
 February 28 – United Kingdom – Moorgate tube crash: For unknown reasons, the driver fails to stop a London Underground train at Moorgate station and continues into the dead-end tunnel beyond. 43 people are killed.
 April 4 – Soviet Union – Žasliai railway disaster: passenger train hits a tank car carrying fuel, derails, and catches fire. 20 people are killed, 80 injured. It remains the worst rail disaster in Lithuania.
 May 22 – Morocco – A derailment near Kenitra kills at least 34 people.

 June 6 – United Kingdom – Nuneaton rail crash: The driver of a London Euston-to-Glasgow train missed a temporary speed restriction at Nuneaton because the propane-burning lamps on the marker sign had run out of fuel. The train derailed; 6 people were killed and 38 injured.
 June 8 – West Germany – Two passenger trains collide head-on between Lenggries and Warngau due to errors by dispatchers at both stations. A total of 41 people are killed (38 passengers, 2 drivers, 1 conductor) and 122 are injured.
 June 12 – Canada – At Simcoe, Ontario, a freight train loaded with newly built cars passing through town goes off the tracks right at a bridge over a road. The locomotive goes nose-down onto the pavement and bursts into flames. Many of the 14 bi- and tri-level railcars behind it derail. Two men in the cab die, a third is seriously injured with burns, and blockage of the road means the town is effectively split in half.

 July 22 – West Germany – A regional train passed a signal at danger and crashed into a freight train head-on, which was crossing the tracks in Hamburg-Hausbruch. 11 passengers were killed, 65 seriously injured. Investigations revealed that the distance between the signal and place of danger was so short that automated braking would not have prevented the crash.
 September 11 – United Kingdom – A diesel-electric multiple unit is in collision with an electric multiple unit at Bricklayers Arms Junction, London. One of the trains had passed a signal a danger, but which appeared to the driver to be showing a proceed aspect due to the reflection of sunlight from his cab. Sixty-two people are injured.
 September 29 – Argentina – Two passenger trains collided in Río Luján, killing 32 and injuring 100.
 October 20 – Mexico – A Mexico City Metro train crashed into another at Metro Viaducto station. From 31 to 39 people are killed, and between 71 and 119 are injured. To date, it is considered the worst accident recorded on the system.
 October 26 – United Kingdom – A passenger train comes to a standstill at Lunan, Angus due to the failure of the locomotive hauling it. Assistance is sent for, but an incorrect location is given. One person is killed and 42 are injured. 
 December 12 – Canada – A Toronto Transit Commission bus, whose rear doors are working erratically due to a missing wire-retaining screw, is immobilized by its own safety features when the doors open on a level crossing on St. Clair Avenue near Scarborough GO Station. Before all the passengers can be evacuated, a GO Train running express from Pickering to Toronto smashes into it. 9 passengers from the bus are killed and about 20 injured.
 December 31 – Ireland – Near Gorey, County Wexford, a passenger train derails on a bridge that was damaged by a vehicle crashing into it. Five people are killed, 43 are injured.

1976 
 January 2 – United Kingdom – A light engine runs into the rear of a parcels train at Worcester Tunnel Junction, Worcestershire. Both crew are killed. Time Interval Working was in operation because fallen trees had brought down the telegraph lines between Droitwich Spa and Worcester Tunnel Junction signal boxes.
 February – Switzerland – A head-on collision on the Yverdon–Ste-Croix line kills seven and injures 40.
 February 7 – United States – 1976 Beckemeyer train accident: A Baltimore & Ohio freight train strikes a pickup truck at an unprotected grade crossing in Beckemeyer, Illinois at about 6:50 pm.  12 people are killed, mostly children; 3 others are injured.
 May 4 – Netherlands - Schiedam train disaster: An international train collides with a local train, killing 24 people and injuring 11.
 May 23 – South Korea – At a level crossing in Seoul, a train collides with a tanker truck carrying flammable liquid; 20 people are killed.
 July 23 – Switzerland – A Riviera Express train derails at Brig. Six people are killed and 32 are injured.
 July 28 – China – Hebei, Tangshan: When the Jinzhou Railway Bureau DFH1 diesel locomotive of Shanhaiguan locomotive depot of Jinzhou Railway Branch, double locomotive Double Locomotive Traction No. 40 express passenger train from Qiqihar to Beijing, when the train runs to the uplink k248+550 between Tianjin–Shanhaiguan railway Tangfang and xugezhuang, the Tangshan earthquake with a magnitude of 7.8 suddenly strikes, Strong vibration and subgrade deformation derailed 40 passenger trains in motion, causing one luggage car to overturn and seven passenger cars to derail. Fortunately, there were no casualties. One of the locomotives caught fire due to fuel leakage. The conductor immediately organized passengers to put out the fire and successfully put out the fire with joint efforts. More than 800 passengers and 47 crew members were safely evacuated after being trapped in the wilderness for three days.
 July 28 – China – Tianjin, Tanggu: Jinzhou Railway Bureau NY7 diesel locomotive of Shanhaiguan locomotive depot of Jinzhou Railway Branch, double locomotive Double Locomotive Traction No. 117 express passenger train from Jining to Sankeshu (三棵树站), when the train runs to the uplink k201+600 between Tianjin–Shanhaiguan railway Beitang and Chadian, the Tangshan earthquake with a magnitude of 7.8 suddenly strikes, Strong vibration and subgrade deformation derailed 117 passenger trains in motion, causing seven passenger cars to derail, 370 reinforced concrete sleepers were crushed, but fortunately there were no casualties.
 August 1 – Japan – Two trains collide head on at Imabashi Station. 210 people are injured.
 September 9 – South Africa – A local train to the black township of Daveyton crashes into the rear of an express stopped for signals at Benoni; 31 people are killed, all on the local.  The cause is not determined except that sabotage is ruled out. 
 October 10 – Mexico – A two-car Chihuahua–Los Mochis passenger train collides head-on with a standing freight train, and plunges to the bottom of a 18-metre (60-foot) embankment, near Copper Canyon, Chihuahua, killing 24 people and injuring 60. Some of the passengers were riding on the roof. The two-car autovia emerged from a tunnel and crashed head-on into a moving freight train.  No passengers were riding on the roof; that would have been impossible.  Railroad employees reported seeing about 60 cadavers; farm laborers' deaths were not counted by authorities.  The autovia engineer was killed and his brother, the conductor, was prosecuted for having bypassed a required siding stop. This edit was prepared by an eyewitness passenger.
 November 3 – Poland – About 2.05 a.m., a Lublin–Wrocław express, on which the train crew had fallen asleep, rams a standing passenger train at Julianka railroad station, Kielce, Świętokrzyskie, killing 25 people and injuring 79.
 November 26 – United States – A defective fissure caused the derailment of several Burlington Northern Railways train cars carrying tanks of propane, butane, and fuel oil as it was passing through the small town of Belt, Montana. Two people were killed and 22 injured.

1977
 January 18 – Australia – Granville rail disaster: 83 people die when a train derails and hits a bridge support. The bridge then falls, crushing part of the train. This is Australia's worst railway accident.
 January 19 – India – Near Benares (now Varanasi), a passenger train collides with a stationary train; 28 are killed and 78 injured.
 February 4 – United States – Chicago Loop derailment, Chicago, Illinois: In the worst accident in the system's history, a Chicago Transit Authority elevated train motorman disregards cab signals and rear-ends another train on the Loop curve at Wabash and Lake Streets during the evening rush hour. Eleven people are killed and over 180 injured as four cars of the rear train derail and fall to the street below. The motorman was discovered to have marijuana in his possession, although it was never determined if he was impaired in any way.
 February 19 – United States – Pandora, Washington. Milwaukee Road Train 201 collides head-on with train 200.
The locomotive and four cars fall into the river and 85 people are killed.
 June 27 – East Germany – Lebus: Because of a dispatcher working under the influence of medication, at Booßen station, near Frankfurt (Oder), a holiday train from Zittau to Stralsund is diverted onto the branch line to Kietz, where it collides with a freight train. 28 people die in the accident, including the train crew of the holiday train; the dispatcher is jailed for five years.
 July 9 – Poland – Psie Pole, near Wrocław: About 8.00 a.m. express "Czech-Russian Friendship" Prague-Moscow collides with locomotive which passed signal at danger: 11 people killed (or perhaps 32), 15 injured (or perhaps 40)
 September 5 – United Kingdom – Due to faulty wiring in a lineside relay cabinet, a mail train and a passenger train are involved in a head-on collision at Farnley Junction, Leeds, West Yorkshire. Two people are killed and fifteen are injured.
Newspaper reports show 70 people killed, but official sources say only 25.
 October 10 – India – Just after midnight, deluxe express passenger train 103 from Howrah to Amritsar crashes into the rear of a freight at Naini; at least 61 are killed and 151 injured, 81 seriously.
 November 12 – Mexico – A National Railroad passenger train collides with a gasoline truck at a grade crossing south of Ciudad Juárez, killing 37 people.
 November 25 – Canada – A second propane tank car explodes at the site of a freight train derailment northwest of Suffield, Alberta. Twenty-five cars remain on the track and most of the derailed cars are on fire. No one lives in the immediate area of the derailment and the three members of the CP Rail crew escape injury.
 November 27 – East Germany – Bitterfeld: The boiler of a Class 01 steam engine explodes for lack of water, killing 9 and injuring 45.

1978
 January 4 – Turkey – The head-on collision of two passenger trains at  kills at least 30 people and injures at least 100.
 February 22 – United States – Waverly tank car explosion, Waverly, Tennessee: A Louisville and Nashville Railroad freight train derails; one tank car containing liquefied petroleum gas explodes two days later, killing 16 people and injuring 43. Numerous buildings in downtown Waverly are destroyed or damaged by force of the blast and resulting fires.
 February 25 – Argentina – A passenger train collides with a truck in Sa Pereira, Santa Fe, killing 55 and injuring 56.
 April 15 – Italy – Due to a landslide, the locomotive of a Lecce–Milan train collides with a Bolzano-Rome train in Murazze di Vado, Bologna, making it derail. 48 people die and 76 are injured.
 July 6 – United Kingdom – Taunton sleeping car fire, Taunton, England: A fire aboard a British Rail sleeping car travelling from Penzance to London Paddington kills 12 people. Investigation shows that the fire was caused by the careless placement of a plastic bag of linens against a heater in the car's vestibule.
 September 10 – United States – As the result of a hotbox, 15 cars of a Conrail freight train derail at a grade crossing in Miamisburg, Ohio, demolishing a house and killing its three occupants. The ensuing investigation by the National Transportation Safety Board and the local police department resulted in a ruling of homicide in the deaths by the Montgomery County Coroner.
 July 16 – Australia – Extra wagons were added to Queensland Rail (QR) train No.242 (loaded with interstate fruit) at Cooroy, behind diesel electric locomotive 1521. Control was lost while the train was travelling down the Cooroy-Eumundi Range, a 1:50 (2%) gradient. The locomotive and most of the wagons rolled and derailed on a right-hand curve. Some of the wagons landed on top of the derailed locomotive which had crashed into a small embankment. The fireman (Driver's Assistant), 23, was killed and the driver was injured. Some of the wagons continued further down the range before derailing. QR's Brisbane, Queensland-based breakdown gang took about 2 weeks to clear the damaged wagons, locomotive and produce from the area. An empty LPG tanker had landed relatively close to the derailed locomotive and the remaining gas was carefully burnt off. The Cooroy-Eumundi range was regraded to a less steep gradient.

1979
 January 4 – Turkey – An accident near Ankara kills 16 people.
 January 9 – Turkey – A rear-end collision between two commuter trains near Ankara, kills 30 people and injures about 100.
 January 26 – Bangladesh – Near Chuadanga, a train derails and overturns, killing at least 70 and injuring at least 300.
 April 8 – United States – Louisville and Nashville Railroad freight train No. 403 derails 29 cars between Milligan, Florida and Crestview, Florida, United States at ~0800 hrs. and punctured tank car leaks anhydrous ammonia, injuring 14.
 April 16 – United Kingdom –  Paisley Gilmour Street accident: head-on collision between two DMU trains after starting signal is passed at danger in a case of "ding-ding, and away". Both drivers and 5 passengers are killed with 67 passengers and 1 guard injured. After this accident the rule change that had made this scenario possible was reversed.
 May 29 – Canada – A UAC TurboTrain operated by Via Rail on westbound service from Montréal to Toronto catches fire near Morrisburg, Ontario after developing an oil leak. A third of the train is totally destroyed, though there are no deaths or injuries due to a rapid evacuation. This is the last major incident for the troubled Turbo Trains, which are retired in 1982.
 July 10 – Italy – A Pompeii-Naples and Naples-Herculaneum commuter train crashed in a violent head-on collision under shadow of Under Vesuvius Line, in Cercola near Mount Vesuvius, Naples, killing 14 people and injuring 70.
 August 21 – Thailand – The head-on collision of freight and passenger trains at Taling Chan kills 52 people and injures about 200.

 August 28 – Netherlands – Nijmegen train collision: 8 people die when two passenger trains (one of which wasn't carrying passengers) collide head-on at Nijmegen. 
 September 13 – Yugoslavia – At Stalać (now in Serbia), a goods train violates signals, possibly because the driver is asleep; it crashes into a passenger train going to Skopje (now in North Macedonia), and 60 people are killed.
 October 2 – United States – The Southwest Limited derails at Lawrence, Kansas. Of the 30 crew and 147 passengers on board, two people are killed and 69 are injured. The cause is excessive speed on a curve. Underlying causes are that the engineer is unfamiliar with the route, and that signage indicating the speed restriction has been removed during track repairs.
Twenty-nine people are injured.
 October 12 - United States - Harvey, Illinois train collision: The Amtrak Shawnee collides head-on into a stopped Illinois Central Gulf freight train, and derails. 2 people killed and 38 injured.
 October 22 – United Kingdom – Invergowrie rail accident: A semaphore signal failed to return completely to danger, and was apparently interpreted wrongly as clear. 5 killed. 
 October 30 – Djibouti – A freight train—with passengers riding in its empty cars, and unusually many of them due to Eid al-Adha—en route from Dire Dawa, Ethiopia, to Djibouti City runs away due to brake failure; it derails at a bridge near Holhol station, which some cars smash into.  There are 63 people killed and 90 injured, mostly women and children.
 November 10 – Canada – Mississauga train derailment in Mississauga, Ontario: tank cars containing propane and chlorine derail due to a hot box, causing a propane fire that burns for days and lofts deadly chlorine high into the air. No one is killed or seriously injured, but more than 250,000 residents are evacuated from the city, the largest peacetime emergency evacuation in North American history until Hurricane Katrina in 2005.
 November 16 – Ireland – , County Dublin. One passenger train runs into another. Thirty-six people are injured.
 December 3 – India – A derailment at Londa, Karnataka kills 23 people and injures at least 12.

See also 

 List of accidents by death toll, category "other"
 List of road accidents – includes level crossing accidents.
 List of rail accidents in Canada
 List of rail accidents in the United Kingdom
 List of Russian rail accidents
 Years in rail transport

References

Sources 

"Freight Train Wreck at Houston." ARR Stories: Freight Train Wreck. N.p., n.d. Web. 10 June 2016.

External links
 Railroad train wrecks 1907–2007

Rail accidents 1970-1979
20th-century railway accidents